Ivory Coast (also known as Côte d'Ivoire) is a country located in West Africa. Ivory Coast's political capital is Yamoussoukro, and its economic capital and largest city is the port city of Abidjan. Ivory Coast has, for the region, a relatively high income per capita (US$1014.4 in 2013) and plays a key role in transit trade for neighboring, landlocked countries. The country is the largest economy in the West African Economic and Monetary Union, constituting 40% of the monetary union’s total GDP. The country is the world's largest exporter of cocoa beans, and the fourth-largest exporter of goods, in general, in sub-Saharan Africa (following South Africa, Nigeria, and Angola).

Notable firms 
This list includes notable companies with primary headquarters located in the country. The industry and sector follow the Industry Classification Benchmark taxonomy. Organizations which have ceased operations are included and noted as defunct.

See also

References 

 
 
Ivory Coast